Indopanolol is a beta blocker.

References 

Beta blockers
Indoles